The 1993 Men's South American Volleyball Championship, took place in 1993 in Córdoba.

Final positions

Mens South American Volleyball Championship, 1993
Men's South American Volleyball Championships
1993 in South American sport
International volleyball competitions hosted by Argentina
1993 in Argentine sport